Eino Seppälä (11 November 1896 – 4 April 1968) was a Finnish track and field athlete. He was born in Virolahti. He competed in the 3000 metres team race at the 1924 Summer Olympics, where the Finnish team won gold medals. He also competed in the 5,000 metre, where he placed fifth.

Eino Seppälä’s great granddaughter is a Finnish tennis player Saana Saarteinen.Saana Saarteinen.

References

1896 births
1968 deaths
People from Virolahti
People from Viipuri Province (Grand Duchy of Finland)
Finnish male middle-distance runners
Olympic athletes of Finland
Olympic gold medalists for Finland
Athletes (track and field) at the 1924 Summer Olympics
Olympic gold medalists in athletics (track and field)
Medalists at the 1924 Summer Olympics
Sportspeople from Kymenlaakso